Dorian Q. Fuller is an American archaeologist and professor of archaeobotany at the UCL Institute of Archaeology. Originally from San Francisco, he studied at Yale University (BA, 1995) and the University of Cambridge (MPhil, 1997; PhD, 2000).

References

External links 

 Staff profile at the UCL Institute of Archaeology
 The Archaeobotanist, Fuller's blog
 

Year of birth missing (living people)
People from San Francisco
American archaeologists
Archaeobotanists
Yale University alumni
Alumni of the University of Cambridge
Academics of the UCL Institute of Archaeology
Archaeologists of the Near East
Living people